The 15th Canadian Comedy Awards, presented by the Canadian Comedy Foundation for Excellence (CCFE), honoured the best live, television, film, and Internet comedy of 2013. The awards ceremony was hosted by Tom Green and held at the Ottawa Little Theatre on 14 September 2014.

Canadian Comedy Awards, also known as Beavers, were awarded in 30 categories. Winners in 7 categories were chosen by the public through an online poll and others were chosen by members of industry organizations.  The awards ceremony was part of the Canadian Comedy Awards Festival which ran from 10 to 14 September and included over 20 comedy events.

The film Sex After Kids and TV series Satisfaction led with seven nominations each.  The big winner was Nathan Fielder who won three Beavers for writing, directing, and performing in TV series Nathan for You.  Jeremy Lalonde won two Beavers for Sex After Kids.  Also winning two Beavers were web series But I'm Chris Jericho! and sketch group Peter 'n Chris.  Dave Foley won Canadian Comedy Person of the Year.

Festival and ceremony

The 15th Canadian Comedy Awards (CCA) was held in Ottawa, Ontario.  Hamilton and Niagara Falls, Ontario, had also been approached to host the awards if they would become home to a new Canadian Comedy Hall of Fame, but the cities declined.

The awards ceremony was hosted by Tom Green and held on 14 September 2014 at the Ottawa Little Theatre at the conclusion of the Canadian Comedy Awards Festival, which ran from 10 to 14 September. The festival included comedy showcases by many of the 150 nominees at venues including the Ottawa Little Theatre, Yuk Yuk's, and Absolute Comedy.  School groups were invited to daytime workshops at the Market Media Mall in ByWard Market, which had interactive exhibits including a standup comedy stage and the television set from The Great White North of SCTV.

Winners and nominees
Between 160 and 180 jurors chose the top-five nominees.  Over 15,000 members of the public voted online for winners in seven categories.  The others were decided by industry members.  Voting was open from July to 15 August.

Web series, which had been included with television awards in the previous year's ceremony, were split into separate categories for this year's awards.  This resulted in 30 award categories and over 150 nominees, the most for any awards ceremony .

Winners are listed first and highlighted in boldface:

Multimedia

Live

Television

Internet

Special Awards

Multiple wins
The following people, shows, films, etc. received multiple awards

Multiple nominations
The following people, shows, films, etc. received multiple nominations

Footnotes

References

External links
Canadian Comedy Awards official website
 (winner for Best Comedy Special or Short)

Canadian Comedy Awards
Canadian Comedy Awards
Awards
Awards